Palliser was a federal electoral district in Saskatchewan, Canada, that was represented in the House of Commons of Canada from 1997 to 2015.

It was named in honour of John Palliser, a geographer and explorer of the Canadian west.

Geography
It included the city of Moose Jaw, the southwest quadrant of the city of Regina and the rural areas around them.

History
The electoral district was created in 1996 from Moose Jaw—Lake Centre and parts of Regina—Lumsden, Regina—Wascana and Swift Current—Maple Creek—Assiniboia ridings.

The Conservative Party of Canada took back this historically New Democratic Party (NDP) seat in 2004.

Following the Canadian federal electoral redistribution, 2012, the riding was abolished. The Regina portion became part of the new riding of Regina—Lewvan, while Moose Jaw and the rural portion became part of Moose Jaw—Lake Centre—Lanigan. Small parts of the riding were transferred to Cypress Hills—Grasslands and Regina—Qu'Appelle.

Members of Parliament

Election results

Note: Conservative vote is compared to the total of Progressive Conservative and Canadian Alliance vote in 2000.

|-

|New Democratic Party
|Dick Proctor
|align="right"|12,136
|align="right"|38.15
|align="right"|-0.06
|align="right"|$54,888

|Liberal
|Garry Johnson
|align="right"|6,492
|align="right"|20.41
|align="right"|-2.66
|align="right"|$60,150

|Progressive Conservative
|Brent Shirkey
|align="right"|1,248
|align="right"|3.92
|align="right"|-4.53
|align="right"|$1,603
|- bgcolor="white"
!align="right" colspan=3|Total valid votes
!align="right"|31,803
!align="right"|100.00
!align="right"|
|- bgcolor="white"
!align="right" colspan=3|Total rejected ballots
!align="right"|99
!align="right"|0.31
!align="right"|-0.27
|- bgcolor="white"
!align="right" colspan=3|Turnout
!align="right"|31,902
!align="right"|62.74
!align="right"|-4.51

Note: Canadian Alliance vote is compared to the Reform vote in 1997.

|-

|New Democratic Party
|Dick Proctor
|align="right"|12,553
|align="right"|38.21
|
|align="right"|$49,066

|Liberal
|Tony Merchant
|align="right"|7,579
|align="right"|23.07
|
|align="right"|$50,830

|Progressive Conservative
|Andy McDougall
|align="right"|2,777
|align="right"|8.45
|
|align="right"|$10,066

|Natural Law
|Jack Heilman
|align="right"|350
|align="right"|1.06
|
|align="right"|
|- bgcolor="white"
!align="right" colspan=3|Total valid votes
!align="right"|32,846
!align="right"|100.00
!
!
|- bgcolor="white"
!align="right" colspan=3|Total rejected ballots
!align="right"|193
!align="right"|0.58
!
!
|- bgcolor="white"
!align="right" colspan=3|Turnout
!align="right"|33,042
!align="right"|67.35
!
!

See also
 List of Canadian federal electoral districts
 Past Canadian electoral districts

References

Notes

External links
 
 Expenditures  2008
 Expenditures - 2004
 Expenditures - 2000
 Expenditures - 1997
 Map of Palliser riding archived by Elections Canada

Moose Jaw
Former federal electoral districts of Saskatchewan
Politics of Regina, Saskatchewan